Echidna rhodochilus is a moray eel found in the Pacific and Indian oceans, around India and the Philippines. It was first named by Bleeker in 1863, and is commonly known as the pink-lipped moray eel.

References

rhodochilus
Fish described in 1863
Taxa named by Pieter Bleeker